Rebellious Flower is a 2016 Hindi-language biographical film directed by Krishan Hooda. The directorial debut written and produced by Jagdish Bharti is based on the early years of Rajneesh Osho. The film won Special Mention Jury Award at 12th Salento International Film Festival, Italy. This is the first biopic on the early life of Osho Rajneesh and it is supported by the Osho Foundation. The film was released on 15 January 2016.

Plot
Rebellious Flower is inspired by the life of spiritual guru Rajneesh Osho. The plot is based on several incidents from his childhood and young life. Child Raja embarks on a journey within himself to understand the universal truth. He meets three mentors - Magga baba, Pagal baba, and Masto baba, who guide him through his journey and help him find the true essence of being

Cast
Prince Shah – Child Raja
Shashank Singh – Young Raja
Mantra - Magga Baba, Pagal Baba and Masto Baba
Kirti Adarkar - Nani
Bachchan Pachera -  Nana
Indal Singh -  Baba
Shaneel Sinha - Librarian Vidya Sagar

Awards and accolades
Winner Inspirational Feature - Cinema World Fest Awards 2017, Ontario, Canada
Winner Best Original Score - Fimucinema 2017, Canary Islands, Spain
Winner Best Director Jury Award - Salento International Film Festival 2015 Italy
Winner Best Debutant Director - LCIFF - Lake City International Film Festival 2015, India
Finalist - Rishikesh Art and Film Festival, India
Finalist - ISFFI - International Spiritual Film Festival
Semi Finalist - SIFF - Southeastern International Film Festival, Georgia, USA
Semi Finalist - California International Film Festival and Davis Chinese Film Festival, California, USA
Official Selection - Nisville Movie Summit 2017, Serbia
Official Selection - Grand Indiewise Convention 2017, Miami Florida, USA 
Official Selection - Lumiere Cinemavvenire Film Festival 2015, Rome, Italy
Official Selection - 10th Tel Aviv Spirit Film Festival, Israel
Official Selection - Wiper Film Festival 2015, New York, USA

References

External links
 
 Pandolin - Krishan Hooda Interview
Stagephod - Krishan Hooda Interview
Jagdish Bharti Interview - Osho News
Mantra Mugdh Interview on Times of India
Film on Osho Rajneesh to release in January

2010s Hindi-language films
2016 films
Indian biographical films
Indian avant-garde and experimental films
2010s avant-garde and experimental films
2010s biographical films
Rajneesh movement